Walker Hampson (24 July 1889 – 28 June 1959) was an English professional footballer who played as a wing half in the Football League for South Shields, Hartlepools United, Charlton Athletic, Chesterfield and Burnley.

Personal life 
Hampson was the brother of footballers Billy and Tommy Hampson. He served as a gunner in the Royal Garrison Artillery during the First World War. In January 1917, Hampson was admitted to No. 11 Casualty Clearing Station at Varennes with synovitis of the right knee. He was discharged from the Army in September 1917.

Career statistics

References

People from Radcliffe, Greater Manchester
English footballers
Burnley F.C. players
South Shields F.C. (1889) players
Charlton Athletic F.C. players
Hartlepool United F.C. players
Chesterfield F.C. players
English Football League players
1889 births
1959 deaths
Brentford F.C. wartime guest players
Clapton Orient F.C. wartime guest players
Association football wing halves
British Army personnel of World War I
Royal Garrison Artillery soldiers
Military personnel from Manchester